Fernán-Núñez is a municipality in the province of Córdoba, Spain. It is the host of the annual Caños Dorados Prize.

References

Municipalities in the Province of Córdoba (Spain)